Starting Today may refer to:

 "Starting Today" (Elvis Presley song), 1961
 "Starting Today" (Nina Sky song), 2009
 "Starting Today", song by Ronnie Milsap from his 1989 album Stranger Things Have Happened
 "Starting Today", song by Natalie Imbruglia from 2005 album Counting Down The Days